Liu Wei (born 27 November 1987) is a Chinese boxer. He competed in the men's welterweight event at the 2016 Summer Olympics.

References

External links
 
 
 
 

1987 births
Living people
Chinese male boxers
Olympic boxers of China
Boxers at the 2016 Summer Olympics
Sportspeople from Shandong
Boxers at the 2014 Asian Games
Asian Games competitors for China
AIBA World Boxing Championships medalists
Welterweight boxers
21st-century Chinese people